Lil Boat 3 is the fourth studio album by American rapper Lil Yachty. It was released on May 29, 2020, by Capitol Records, Motown Records, and Quality Control Music. The album serves as the third and final installment of the Lil Boat series and the sequel to Lil Boat 2. The album was recorded four times over and was described by Yachty as "upbeat" and "heavy-hitting". It features guest appearances from Tierra Whack, ASAP Rocky, Tyler, the Creator, Future, Draft Day, DaBaby, Drake, Lil Keed, Young Thug, and Lil Durk, with production by JetsonMade, Mike Will Made It, Pi'erre Bourne, Earl on the Beat, K Swisha, and Lil Yachty himself, among others.

Lil Boat 3 received mixed reviews from critics and debuted at number 14 on the US Billboard 200. The album was supported by three singles: "Oprah's Bank Account", "Split/Whole Time", and "Coffin". The deluxe version of the album, titled Lil Boat 3.5, was released on November 27.

Background
On August 10, 2019, Lil Yachty made his first official announcement of the project while on an Instagram live stream with frequent collaborator Trippie Redd. When questioned about the status of the album, he said that it would be released in October 2019. Yachty later said that in terms of production, he was working with producers The Alchemist, Ronny J, Pi'erre Bourne, Earl on the Beat, and his brother. Lil Yachty said rappers Playboi Carti and Oliver Tree would be on the album. Following the release of the lead single, "Oprah's Bank Account", Yachty tweeted "Lil Boat 3, coming soon". The album's release date was announced on May 20, 2020.

Recording and composition
Speaking to XXL in April 2020, Yachty's manager Coach K revealed that the album had been worked on for "the last year-and-a-half". Lil Yachty recorded the album four times over before submitting the final effort to his label in early 2020, stating he went through "many different phases of creativity". The album features throwback 2016 melodies the rapper built his career on. Yachty described the album as "upbeat" and "heavy-hitting". Earl on the Beat produced eight out of the album's 19 tracks, including its first two singles, "Oprah's Bank Account" and "Split/Whole Time".

Cover art
The black-and-white album cover is a picture of a 2-year old Lil Yachty that his father captured.

Promotion
The lead single for Lil Boat 3 was released on March 9, 2020, titled "Oprah's Bank Account". Featuring melodic, autotuned vocals similar to those of his first project, the track also features fellow rappers Drake and DaBaby. To accompany the track, Lil Yachty released a 9-minute mini movie in which he acts as famous talk show host Oprah Winfrey. The track was produced by frequent collaborator Earl on the Beat. On May 26, Lil Yachty released the second single for Lil Boat 3, titled "Split/Whole Time", alongside its music video. As with "Oprah's Bank Account", this song was also produced by Earl on the Beat. "Coffin" was released on October 23, 2020, as album's third single (first from the deluxe edition).

Critical reception

Lil Boat 3 was met with mixed reviews. At Metacritic, which assigns a normalized rating out of 100 to reviews from professional publications, the album received an average score of 59, based on four reviews.

In a lukewarm review, AllMusic's Fred Thomas wrote, "Yachty's progress mostly shows up in his drive to push his music to new places, but he takes steps backwards by overpadding Lil Boat 3 with too many similar, unnecessary tracks". In a mixed review, Clashs Robin Murray stated: "At times, Lil Boat 3 comes close to grappling with maturity, but Lil Yachty's version of adulthood feels distinctly shallow." Mimi Kenny of HipHopDX said, "Even if Lil Boat 3 came out in a time without so much surface tension (is such a thing still possible?), it'd still feel sloppy and forgettable. The presence of personalities like Lil Yachty's should be welcomed, but the execution still needs to be there". 

Ryan Feyre of RapReviews praised the album, stating, "Lil Boat 3 finds Yachty syncopating and stretching beyond his naturally baritone voice. He sounds more self-aware than ever, channeling his beloved infectious energy as the main driver for the album, rather than his erratic lyrical ability".

Commercial performance
Lil Boat 3 debuted on number 14 on the US Billboard 200, with 30,000 album-equivalent units in its first week.

Track listing

Notes
  signifies a co-producer

Sample credits
 "T.D" contains elements from "Tokyo Drift", written by Pharrell Williams, Seiji Kameyama, Verbal, Ryo-Z and Keisuke Ogihara, performed by Teriyaki Boyz.

Personnel
Credits adapted from the album's liner notes and Tidal.

 Colin Leonard – mastering engineer
 Thomas "Tillie" Mann – mixer (1–4, 6–27)
 Steve "The Sauce" Hybicki – mixer (4)
 Gentuar Memishi – recording engineer

Charts

Release history

References

2020 albums
Lil Yachty albums
Albums produced by JetsonMade
Albums produced by Mike Will Made It
Albums produced by Pi'erre Bourne
Sequel albums